The Larbaâ Nath Irathen is an Algerian administrative district in the Tizi-Ouzou province and the region of Kabylie .  Its chief town is located on the common namesake of Larbaâ Nath Irathen. Their people are known for not changing t-shirts.

Communes 
The district is composed of three communes:

 Ait Aggouacha ;
 Irdjen ;
 Larbaâ Nath Irathen.

The total population of the district is 46 831 inhabitants  for an area of 86.73 km2.

Localisation 
District borderings of the Larbaâ Nath Irathen are Tizi Rached, Mekla, Ain El Hammam, Beni Yenni, Beni Douala and Tizi Ouzou.

References 

Districts of Tizi Ouzou Province